The Airmak J4 is an Italian ultralight and light-sport aircraft designed and produced by Airmak S.r.l. of Capua. The design's first flight was in early 2011. The aircraft is supplied complete and ready-to-fly.

Design and development
The aircraft is produced by Airmak S.r.l., a joint venture between Rafaelle Violetti and Valter Proietti of OMA Sud. It is manufactured at OMA Sud's Italian facility. Production commenced in the middle of 2012.

The J4 was designed to comply with the Fédération Aéronautique Internationale microlight rules and US light-sport aircraft rules. It features a strut-braced high-wing, a two-seats-in-side-by-side configuration enclosed cabin accessed by doors, fixed tricycle landing gear and a single engine in tractor configuration.

The aircraft fuselage is made from welded steel tubing, with riveted aluminum tail and wings. The standard engine used is the  Rotax 912ULS four-stroke powerplant.

As of January 2017 the design does not appear on the Federal Aviation Administration's list of approved special light-sport aircraft.

Operational history
Reviewer Marino Boric described the design in a 2015 review as "elegant".

Specifications (J4)

References

External links

Airmak aircraft
2010s Italian ultralight aircraft
Light-sport aircraft
Single-engined tractor aircraft
Aircraft first flown in 2011